The Hutsuls (sometimes the spelling variant: Gutsuls; ;) are an East Slavic ethnic group spanning parts of western Ukraine and Romania (i.e. parts of Bukovina and Maramureș). They have often been officially and administratively designated as a subgroup of Ukrainians and are largely regarded as constituting a broader Ukrainian ethnic group.

Etymology
The origin of the name Hutsul is uncertain. The most common derivations are from the Romanian word for "outlaw" (cf. Rom. hoț–"thief", hoțul–"the thief"), and the Slavic kochul (Ukr. kochovyk–"nomad") which is a reference to the semi-nomadic shepherd lifestyle or the inhabitants who fled into the mountains after the Mongol invasion. Other proposed derivations include from the Turkic tribe of the Utsians or Uzians, and even to the name of the Moravian Grand Duke Hetsyla, among others. As the name is first attested in 1816, it is considered to be of recent origin and as an exonym, used by neighboring groups and not Hutsuls themselves, although some have embraced it. The region inhabited by Hutsuls is named as Hutsulshchyna. Their name is also found in the name of Hutsul Alps, Hutsul Beskyd, Hutsulshchyna National Park, and National Museum of Hutsulshchyna and Pokuttya Folk Art.

History and origins

Hutsuls inhabit areas situated between the south-east of those inhabited by the Boykos, down to the northern part of the Romanian segment of the Carpathians. Several hypotheses account for the origin of the Hutsuls, however, like all the Rusyns, they most probably have a diverse ethnogenetic origin. It is generally considered to be descendants of the White Croats, a Slavic tribe that inhabited the area, also Tivertsi, and possibly Ulichs who had to leave their previous home near the Southern Bug river under pressure from the Pechenegs. There is also considered a relation to Vlach shepherds who later immigrated from Transylvania, because of which some scholars like Romanian historian Nicolae Iorga argued that "huțuli" or "huțani" are denationalized Vlachs / Romanians. According to the 1930 Romanian census, in Romania within its borders at that time, including northern Bukovina, currently a part of Ukraine, there were 12,456 Hutsuls. According to the Romanian census of 1941, in addition to the mostly (51.2%) self-identified ethnically Ukrainian population of Northern Bukovina, almost all the 6,767 inhabitants of the Seletyn district (plasa) were self-identified ethnic Hutsuls.

Language
Hutsul is considered to be a dialect of Western Ukrainian with some Polish and Ukrainian influences) along with Pokuttia-Bukovina dialect and the dialects of the Lemkos and Boykos.
Since the annexation of western Ukraine regions, including Ivano-Frankivsk and Chernivtsi oblast as well as Transcarpathia by the Soviet Union, compulsory education has been conducted only in standardized literary Ukrainian. In recent years there have been grassroots efforts to keep the traditional Hutsul dialect alive.

Way of life and culture

Traditional Hutsul culture is often represented by the colorful and intricate craftsmanship of their clothing, sculpture, architecture, woodworking, metalworking (especially in brass), rug weaving, pottery, and egg decorating (see pysanka). Along with other Hutsul traditions, as well as their songs and dances, this culture is often celebrated and highlighted by the different countries that Hutsuls inhabit.

Ukrainian Hutsul culture bears a resemblance to neighboring cultures of western and southwestern Ukraine, particularly Lemkos and Boykos. These groups also share similarities with other Slavic highlander peoples, such as the Gorals in Poland and Slovakia. Similarities have also been noted with some Vlach cultures such as the Moravian Wallachians in the Czech Republic, as well as some cultures in Romania. Most Hutsuls belong to the Ukrainian Greek Catholic Church and the Ukrainian Orthodox Church.

Hutsul society was traditionally based on forestry and logging, as well as cattle and sheep breeding; the Hutsuls are credited with having created the breed of horse known as the Hucul pony. One of the main attributes of Hutsuls' is their Shepherd's axe (bartka), a small axe with a long handle that is still used to this day for chopping wood, as a cane, for fighting and traditional ceremonies. They would often be intricately decorated with traditional wood carving designs and passed on from generation to generation especially upon marriage. They use unique musical instruments, including the "trembita" (trâmbiţa), a type of alpenhorn, as well multiple varieties of the fife, or sopilka, that are used to create unique folk melodies and rhythms. Also frequently used are the duda (bagpipe), the drymba (Jew's harp), and the tsymbaly (hammered dulcimer).

The Hutsuls served as an inspiration for many artists, such as writers Ivan Franko, Lesya Ukrainka, Mykhailo Kotsiubynsky, Vasyl Stefanyk, Marko Cheremshyna, Mihail Sadoveanu and Stanisław Vincenz, and painters such as Kazimierz Sichulski and Teodor Axentowicz—famous for his portraits and subtle scenes of Hutsul life—and Halyna Zubchenko. Sergei Parajanov's 1965 film Shadows of Forgotten Ancestors (Тіні забутих предків), which is based on the book by Mykhailo Kotsiubynsky, portrays scenes of traditional Hutsul life. Composer Ludmila Anatolievna Yaroshevskaya composed a work for piano based on Hutsul folk music (Fantasy on Hutsul Themes).

Every summer, the village of Sheshory in Ukraine hosts a three-day international festival of folk music and art. Two Hutsul-related museums are located in Kolomyia, Ukraine: the Pysanky museum and the Museum of Hutsul and Pokuttya Folk Art. Traditional Hutsul sounds and moves were used by the Ukrainian winner of the 2004 Eurovision song contest, Ruslana Lyzhychko.

The Romanian Hutsuls have a Festival of Hutsuls at the Moldova-Sulița village in Suceava county.
In the 1996 elections to the Romanian Chamber of Deputies, the General Union of the Associations of the Hutsul Ethnicity (Uniunea Generala a Asociatiilor Etniei Hutule) obtained 646 votes (0.01% of the total). In the 2000 elections to the Romanian Chamber of Deputies, the General Union of the Associations of the Hutsul Ethnicity (Uniunea Generala a Asociatiilor Etniei Hutule) obtained 1225 votes out of 10,839,424	votes (0.01% of the total). According to the representatives of the Hutsuls, in the 2002 census, they "preferred to declare themselves Romanians in order not to be included in the category of Ukrainians".

Notable people

 Matei Vișniec, playwright
 Thomas Bell, writer
 Marko Cheremshyna, writer
 Oleksa Dovbush, leader of opryshky movement
 Vasile Hutopilă, painter
 Mickola Vorokhta, painter, Merited Artist of Ukraine
 Volodymyr Ivasyuk, composer
 Elisabeta Lipă, multiple world and Olympic rowing champion
 Ivan Malkovych, publisher
 , sculptor, woodcarver
 Mariya Yaremchuk, singer
 Nazariy Yaremchuk, singer

Gallery

See also 
 49th Hutsul Rifle Regiment
 Hutsul Republic
 Hutsulka
 Kolomyjka
 Galicia (Eastern Europe)

References

External links

 hutsul.museum National Museum of Hutsulshchyna and Pokuttya Folk Art
 Romanian-Hutsul  and Hutsul-English  glossaries
 Huţuls of northern Moldavia 
 Introduction to Hutsul Country
 Hutsul Portal (mostly in Romanian) 
 Photo exposition about Hutsul people in Ukraine
 Hutsuls: lifestyle, food and clothing

 
Bukovina
Ethnic groups in Romania
Ethnic groups in Ukraine
Maramureș
Slavic ethnic groups
Slavic highlanders
Ukrainian words and phrases